The following highways are numbered 347:

Australia
 - Heathcote-Rochester Road

Canada
Manitoba Provincial Road 347
 Nova Scotia Route 347
Prince Edward Island Route 347
 Quebec Route 347

India
National Highway 347

Japan
 Japan National Route 347

United States
  Arizona State Route 347
  Arkansas Highway 347
  Colorado State Highway 347
  County Road 347 (Levy County, Florida)
  Georgia State Route 347
  Maryland Route 347
  Mississippi Highway 347
  New Jersey Route 347
  New Mexico State Road 347
 New York:
  New York State Route 347 (disambiguation)
  County Route 347 (Erie County, New York)
  Ohio State Route 347
  Pennsylvania Route 347
  Puerto Rico Highway 347
  Tennessee State Route 347
  Texas State Highway 347
  Virginia State Route 347